The 10th Space Operations Squadron (10 SOPS) is the United States Space Force unit responsible for operating the Mobile User Objective System and Ultra-High Frequency Follow-On satellite constellations, providing global communications to the United States Armed Forces.

History

Navy (1962-2022) 

The first military space operations command in history, the Navy Astronautics Group (NAVASTROGRU or NAG) was founded in April 1962. Tasked with operating the Navy's satellites, the unit commanded the Navy Navigational Satellite System, also known as Transit, the world's first satellite navigation system. The Navy Astronautics Group was redesignated as the Naval Satellite Operations Center (NAVSOC) in June 1990.

Space Force (2022-present) 

In September 2021, it was announced that NAVSOC would be transferred from the Navy to the newly-independent US Space Force under Space Delta 8. On 6 June 2022, NAVSOC was formally disestablished and 10 SOPS assumed its mission, personnel, resources, and heritage in total. According to Space Delta 8, the squadron was given its number to honor its heritage under 10th Fleet.

Constellations 
The unit has operated various types of military satellites, including:

Command Structure 
 Headquarters, Naval Base Ventura County, Point Mugu, California
 Detachment A, Prospect Harbor, Maine
 Detachment C, Naval Computer and Telecommunications Station, Dededo, Guam
 Detachment D, Schriever SFB, El Paso County, Colorado
Former site:
 Detachment B, Rosemount, Minnesota (disestablished August 1997)

List of commanders 

 Lt Col Jason Sanders, 6 June 2022

References

External links
 

Military education and training in the United States